Antonio Romano may refer to:

 Antonio Romano (musician) (born 1962), Argentine thrash metal guitarist
 Antonio Romano (footballer, born 1995), Italian professional footballer 
 Antonio Romano (footballer, born 1996), Italian football player

See also
 Tony Romano (disambiguation)